Bohdan Mel'nychenko (born 15 May 1989) is a professional Ukrainian footballer.

Career
He played for Ukrainian Premier League club FC Karpaty Lviv. He is the product of the Karpaty Lviv Youth School System.

External links 
Website Karpaty Profile
Profile on EUFO
Profile on Football Squads

1989 births
Living people
Ukrainian footballers
FC Karpaty-2 Lviv players
Association football goalkeepers
FC Arsenal-Kyivshchyna Bila Tserkva players